The A342 highway is a highway in Nigeria. It is one of the east-west roads linking the main south-north roads. It is named from the two highways it links, the A3 highway and A4 highway.

It runs between the A3 at Aba, Abia State — and the beginning of the A4 on the southern side of Cross River, at Oron  in Akwa Ibom State.

The road passes through Ikot Ekpene and Uyo.

References

Highways in Nigeria
Abia State
Akwa Ibom State